Filip Polášek and Igor Zelenay were the defending champions but Polášek decided not to participate.
Zelenay partnered with Dustin Brown, losing in the first round.
Johan Brunström and Ken Skupski won the title, defeating Kenny de Schepper and Édouard Roger-Vasselin 7–6(7–4), 6–3 in the final.

Seeds

Draw

Draw

References
 Main Draw

Ethias Trophy - Doubles
2011 Ethias Trophy